The Wisconsin Interscholastic Athletic Association's Big Eight Conference is a high school athletic conference in south-central Wisconsin. The management of the conference is vested in the principals of the member schools, who determine the rules governing eligibility of athletes and schedules.

Member schools
Beloit Memorial High School (leaving in 2023 for Southern Lakes Conference)
Janesville Craig High School (all sports but football)
Janesville Parker High School (all sports but football)
Madison East High School
Madison La Follette High School
Madison Vel Phillips Memorial High School
Madison West High School
Middleton High School
Sun Prairie East High School (all sports but football)
Sun Prairie West High School (all sports but football)
Verona Area High School

Associated schools
Fort Atkinson High School / Cambridge High School (boys' volleyball only)
Edgewood High School of the Sacred Heart (boys' volleyball only)

History
In summer 2018, a plan to move Janesville Craig and Janesville Parker out of the Big Eight to the Badger South Conference for football only emerged.
In the spring of 2020, the conference voted to accept Sun Prairie West High School as a member once the school opens in 2022. In 2022, Beloit Memorial High School announced they would be joining the Southern Lakes Conference in 2023 with the exception of Football, which will move to the SLC in Fall 2022.

References

External links
 

Wisconsin high school sports conferences